İskender Köksal (born 22 August 1981) is a Turkish former professional footballer who played as a defender.

He started his professional career with Beşiktaş and he also played for Yalovaspor, Gebzespor, Yeniköyspor, Anadolu Üsküdar, Balıkesirspor, Kocaelispor, Konya Şekerspor and Balıkesirspor.

External links

References

1981 births
Footballers from Istanbul
Living people
Turkish footballers
Association football defenders
Beşiktaş J.K. footballers
Yalovaspor footballers
Gebzespor footballers
Anadolu Üsküdar 1908 footballers
Balıkesirspor footballers
Kocaelispor footballers
1922 Konyaspor footballers
Alanyaspor footballers
Bozüyükspor footballers
Gümüşhanespor footballers
Pendikspor footballers
TFF Second League players